Romanu is a commune located in Brăila County, Muntenia, Romania. It is composed of two villages, Oancea and Romanu.

References

Communes in Brăila County
Localities in Muntenia